Volksstimme (meaning People's Voice in English) is a regional daily newspaper published in Magdeburg for northern Saxony-Anhalt, Germany. The paper is owned by Bauer. Its publisher is Magdeburger Verlags und Druckhaus.

The circulation of Volksstimme was 343,000 copies during the third quarter of 1992. Its circulation was 264,000 copies in 2001. The paper had an average circulation of 191,878 copies during the second quarter of 2011.

List of editors-in-chief
Editors-in-chief of the Volksstimme:

References

External links

Bauer Media Group
German-language newspapers
Mass media in Magdeburg
Daily newspapers published in Germany
German news websites